Events in the year 2017 in South Korea.

Incumbents

 President: 
 Park Geun-hye (Powers and duties suspended as of December 9, 2016), 
 Hwang Kyo-ahn (Acting President as of December 9, 2016); 
 Moon Jae-in (since 10 May)
 Prime Minister: 
 until 11 May: Hwang Kyo-ahn 
 11 May-31 May: Yoo Il-ho (acting)
 starting 31 May: Lee Nak-yeon

Events
17 February – Hanjin Shipping was bankruptcy.
3 April – Lotte Corporation shoots off fireworks to celebrate its opening of the 123-floor Lotte World Tower in Seoul, South Korea. It is the tallest skyscraper in Korea and the 5th tallest in the world.
9 May – 2017 South Korean presidential election

Deaths

18 January – Jung Mi-Kyung, novelist (b. 1960)
30 October - Kim Joo-hyuk, actor (b. 1972)
18 December
 Kim Jong-Hyun, lead singer, SHINee (b. 1990)
 Choi Seo-In, comedian, (b. 1983)

See also
List of South Korean films of 2017
2017 in South Korean music
2017 in South Korean football
Years in South Korea

References

 
2010s in South Korea
Years of the 21st century in South Korea
South Korea
South Korea